Nathalie von Siebenthal (born 30 September 1993) is a former Swiss cross-country skier. She competed in the World Cup 2015 season.

She represented Switzerland at the FIS Nordic World Ski Championships 2015 in Falun, Sweden.

On 23 October 2019, she announced her retirement from cross-country skiing.

Cross-country skiing results
All results are sourced from the International Ski Federation (FIS).

Olympic Games

World Championships

World Cup

Season standings

References

External links 
 

1993 births
Living people
Swiss female cross-country skiers
Cross-country skiers at the 2018 Winter Olympics
Olympic cross-country skiers of Switzerland
Tour de Ski skiers
21st-century Swiss women